(born 8 October 1996) is a Japanese ski jumper. She is one of the most successful female ski jumpers to date, as well as one of the most successful athletes in the history of the sport, having won four World Cup overall titles (an all-time female record), seven World Championship medals, and a Winter Olympic medal. , Takanashi holds the record for the most individual World Cup wins, male or female, with 63. She also has three Guinness World Records certificates for the most podium finishes in the Ski Jumping World Cup, the most individual victories by a female in the Ski Jumping World Cup, and the most Ski Jumping World Cup individual victories in a career (overall).

Career
Takanashi placed sixth at the 2011 World Championship in Oslo. In the World Cup, she debuted on 3 December 2011 in Lillehammer where she finished fifth.

During the 2013–14 season, Takanashi won 15 out of 18 individual World Cup ski jumping events. At the 2014 Winter Olympics, she was ranked third after her first jump in the medal round, but dropped to fourth place in the final round and missed the podium. In the 2015–16 season, she won her third World Cup overall title.

Takanashi also won the first-ever women's World Cup team competition in Hinterzarten on 16 December 2017. Her teammates included Yuki Ito, Kaori Iwabuchi and Yuka Seto.

She won a bronze medal in the individual normal hill event at the 2018 Winter Olympics in Pyeongchang.

Major tournament results

Winter Olympics

FIS Nordic World Ski Championships

World Cup

Standings

Individual wins

Individual starts

References

External links

 

1996 births
Japanese female ski jumpers
Living people
Olympic ski jumpers of Japan
Ski jumpers at the 2014 Winter Olympics
Ski jumpers at the 2018 Winter Olympics
Ski jumpers at the 2022 Winter Olympics
FIS Nordic World Ski Championships medalists in ski jumping
Ski jumpers at the 2012 Winter Youth Olympics
Medalists at the 2018 Winter Olympics
Olympic bronze medalists for Japan
Olympic medalists in ski jumping
Holmenkollen medalists
Youth Olympic gold medalists for Japan
20th-century Japanese women
21st-century Japanese women